Hyalinobatrachium munozorum, also known as Upper Amazon glass frog, is a species of frog in the family Centrolenidae. It is found in the upper Amazon Basin in Ecuador, Colombia, and northern Bolivia; it is presumably to be found in intervening Peru; earlier records from Peru have been assigned to Hyalinobatrachium carlesvilai.

Males measure  and females  in snout–vent length.

References

munozorum
Amphibians of the Andes
Amphibians of Bolivia
Amphibians of Colombia
Amphibians of Ecuador
Amphibians described in 1973
Taxa named by William Edward Duellman
Taxa named by John Douglas Lynch
Taxonomy articles created by Polbot